Macelwane is a surname. Notable people with the surname include:

 Geraldine Macelwane (1909–1974), American jurist
 James B. Macelwane (1883–1956), Jesuit Catholic priest and seismologist

See also
 Mount Macelwane, mountain in Antarctica